The 1999 Miami RedHawks football team represented the Miami University in the 1999 NCAA Division I-A football season. They played their home games at Yager Stadium in Oxford, Ohio and competed as members of the Mid-American Conference. The team was coached by head coach Terry Hoeppner.

Schedule

Roster

References

Miami
Miami RedHawks football seasons
Miami RedHawks football